Carina Hägg (born 1957) is a Swedish social democratic politician. She has been a member of the Riksdag since 1995. She is also a member of the AWEPA Governing Council.

References

External links
Carina Hägg at the Riksdag website

Members of the Riksdag from the Social Democrats
Living people
1957 births
Women members of the Riksdag
Members of the Riksdag 2002–2006
21st-century Swedish women politicians